A non-binding two-part referendum was held in Moldova on 24 February 2019, alongside parliamentary elections. Voters were asked two questions; whether the number of MPs should be reduced from 101 to 61 and whether MPs should be open to recall. Both proposals were approved by voters, with voter turnout above the 33% threshold required to validate the result.

Campaign
Parties were able to formally register as part of the for or against campaigns for both questions.

Results

References

Moldova
2019 in Moldova
Referendums in Moldova